Carlo J. Caparas's Panday Kids, or simply Panday Kids, is a 2010 Philippine television drama fantasy series broadcast by GMA Network. The series is a television sequel to the 2009 film Ang Panday. Directed by Mike Tuviera and Dominic Zapata, it stars Sabrina Man, Buboy Villar and Julian Trono. It premiered on February 22, 2010 on the network's Telebabad line up replacing Darna. The series concluded on June 4, 2010 with a total of 72 episodes. It was replaced by Pilyang Kerubin in its timeslot.

Cast and characters

Lead cast
 Buboy Villar as Oliver
 Julian Trono as Hadji
 Sabrina Man as Charlie

Supporting cast
 Jolina Magdangal as Ola
 Marvin Agustin as Lizardo
 Iza Calzado as Maria Makiling
 Gelli de Belen as Rosanna
 Ryan Eigenmann as Andreas
 Marissa Delgado as Guada Salcedo
 Pen Medina as Tasyo
 Nanette Inventor as Fidela
 Jose Manalo as Mambo
 Polo Ravales as Cicero
 Danilo Barrios as Areas
 Paulo Avelino as Alfred / Aureus
 Ella Cruz as Jenny
 Jackie Rice as Jana / Sarah
 Rich Asuncion as Fatima
 Akihiro Sato as Oswaldo / Kakak
 Nikki Samonte as Wendy
 Yogo Singh as Makoy
 Miggy Jimenez as Sintoy
 Franchesca Salcedo as Marva

Recurring cast
 Ama Quiambao as older Maria Makiling
 Paolo Paraiso as Ruben
 Miguel Tanfelix as Orix
 Rob Sy as Oxo
 Jan Manual as Hamogo
 Lian Paz as Cecilia
 Gabriel Roxas as Butchoy
 Isabel Granada as Tessa
 Bernard Palanca as James Villafuerte

Guest cast
 Angelika Dela Cruz as Ester
 Tirso Cruz III as Augusto Luna
 Katrina Halili as Wenoa
 Sheena Halili as Oxana
 Carlo Aquino as Elvin
 Marti San Juan
 John Carlo Tan
 Nathalie Hart as Luningning
 Gerard Pizarras as Diego
 Jomari Yllana as Flavio
 Christopher de Leon as a teacher
 JC de Vera as Aureus

Ratings
According to AGB Nielsen Philippines' Mega Manila household television ratings, the pilot episode of Panday Kids earned a 34.8% rating. While the final episode scored a 16.5% rating.

Accolades

References

External links

Panday
2010 Philippine television series debuts
2010 Philippine television series endings
Fantaserye and telefantasya
Filipino-language television shows
GMA Network drama series
Television shows based on comics
Television shows set in the Philippines